Katpadi is a locality in Vellore, at the northern part of Vellore city in the state of Tamil Nadu, India.

Politics and geography
Once a village, Katpadi was upgraded to a panchayat town, with its own taluk office. It has a major assembly constituency which is part of Arakkonam (Lok Sabha constituency).

Vellore Institute of Technology University (VIT) 
The Vellore Institute of Technology University (VIT) is in Katpadi. In 2010 it was ranked as one of the best private engineering universities in India.

References

External links 
 
 Katpadi traintiming

Vellore
Neighbourhoods in Vellore